The 31st Senate District of Wisconsin is one of 33 districts in the Wisconsin State Senate.  Located in western Wisconsin, the district comprises all of Buffalo, Pepin, and Trempealeau counties, and most of Pierce County, as well as western Eau Claire County, western Jackson County, and part of southern Dunn County.  It includes most of the city of Eau Claire, as well as the cities of Arcadia, Buffalo City, Durand, Galesville, Independence, Prescott, and Whitehall.  The district also contains landmarks such as Trempealeau National Wildlife Refuge, Perrot State Park, and University of Wisconsin–Eau Claire.

Current elected officials
Jeff Smith is the senator representing the 31st district. He was first elected in 2018 general election.  He previously served in the Wisconsin State Assembly from 2007 through 2011.

Each Wisconsin State Senate district is composed of three Wisconsin State Assembly districts.  The 31st Senate district comprises the 91st, 92nd, and 93rd Assembly districts.  The current representatives of those districts are:
 Assembly District 91: Jodi Emerson (D–Eau Claire)
 Assembly District 92: Treig Pronschinske (R–Mondovi)
 Assembly District 93: Warren Petryk (R–Washington)

The district is located almost entirely within Wisconsin's 3rd congressional district, which is represented by U.S. Representative Ron Kind.  The exception is areas in northern Jackson County, and central Chippewa County, north of Chippewa Falls, which fall within Wisconsin's 7th congressional district, which is represented by U.S. Representative Tom Tiffany.

Past senators
Previous senators include:

Note: the boundaries of districts have changed repeatedly over history. Previous politicians of a specific numbered district have represented a completely different geographic area, due to redistricting.

References

External links
District Website
Senator Smith's Website

Wisconsin State Senate districts
Buffalo County, Wisconsin
Trempealeau County, Wisconsin
Pepin County, Wisconsin
Pierce County, Wisconsin
Dunn County, Wisconsin
Eau Claire County, Wisconsin
Clark County, Wisconsin
Jackson County, Wisconsin
Monroe County, Wisconsin
1861 establishments in Wisconsin